Anna Shikusho (born 5 April 1995) is a Namibian footballer who plays as a forward for the Namibia women's national team.

International career
Shikusho capped for Namibia at senior level during the 2018 Africa Women Cup of Nations qualification.

References

1995 births
Living people
Namibian women's footballers
Namibia women's international footballers
Women's association football forwards